Statistics of Primera División Uruguaya for the 2000 season.

Overview
It was contested by 18 teams, and Nacional won the championship.

Apertura

Clausura

Overall

Playoff
Nacional 1-0 ; 1-1 Peñarol
Nacional won the championship.

References
Uruguay - List of final tables (RSSSF)

Uruguayan Primera División seasons
Uru
2000 in Uruguayan football